This is a list of mountains in the state of Maine.

References

Maine
Mountains
Maine